The following is a list of mayors of the city of Kropyvnytskyi, Ukraine. It includes positions equivalent to mayor, such as chairperson of the city council executive committee.

Mayors

Before 1917
 "Alexey Romanov" (Олексій Романов), 1787-1791
 Gregory Romanov (Григорій Романов), 1791-1794
 Petro Klenov (Петро Кленов), 1794-1797
 Ivan Pronin (Іван Пронін), 1797–1800
 Savin Golikov (Савин Голиков), 1800-1803
 Ivan Titov (Іван Титов), 1803-1806
 Ivan Dykov (Іван Диков), 1806-1815
 Yakim Rogalyov (Яким Рогальов), 1815-1818
 Ivan Yurievich Fundukley (Іван Юрійович Фундуклей), 1818-1819
 Ivan Areshnikov (Іван Арешников), 1819-1821
 Yakiv Stepanovych Pashutin (Яків Степанович Пашутін), 1821-1829
 Demyan Yakovlevich Samokishin (Дем'ян Якович Самокишин), 1829-1830
 Peter Shchedrin (Петро Щедрін), 1830-1831
 Ivan Kurchaninov (Іван Курчанинов), 1831-1832
 Ivan Shigartsev (Іван Шигарцев), 1832-1833
 Dmitry Shigartsev (Дмитро Шигарцев), 1833-1836
 Sidir V. Mystyushin (Сидір Васильович Мистюшин), 1836-1845
 Jacob Timofeevich Kovalev (Яків Тимофійович Ковальов), 1845-1848
 Peter Egorovich Sakharov (Петро Єгорович Сахаров), 1848-1851
 Mykola Petrovich Pashutin (Микола Петрович Пашутін), 1851-1854
 Fedor Alekseevich Makarov (Федір Олексійович Макаров), 1854-1857
 Mykola Mykytovych Makeev (Микола Микитович Макеєв), 1857-1860
 Vasily Alekseevich Vashakin (Василь Олексійович Вашакін), 1860-1863
 Mykola Petrovich Pashutin (Микола Петрович Пашутін), 1863-1864
 Ivan Mykytovych Makeev (Іван Микитович Макеєв), 1864-1866
  (Самуїл Костянтинович Турчанов), 1866-1878
  (Олександр Миколайович Пашутін), 1878–1905
  (Микола Іванович Іванов), 1906-1911
 Hryhoriy Yosypovych Volokhin (Григорій Йосипович Волохін), 1912-1917

Since 1917
 SP Kramarenko (С. П. Крамаренко), 1917-1918
 BP Volotkovsky (Б. П. Волотковський), 1918
 Vladimir Mikhailovich Sprenzhin (Володимир Михайлович Спренжин), 1918
 Ulyanov (Ульянов), 1919
 Ivan Yukhimovich Pine (Іван Юхимович Сосна), 1919
 Francevich (Францевич), 1920
 VM Strelkov (В. М. Стрелков), 1920
 Saltanov (Салтанов), 1921
 Maryanov (Мар'янов), 1921-1923
 Radchenko (Радченко), 1923-1925
 A. Manuylenko (А. Мануйленко), 1925-1926
 Тонконогий, 1926-1928
  (Трифон Маркович Гуляницький), 1928-1929
 Mikhail Ivanovich Biryukov (Михайло Іванович Бирюков), 1929-1931
 Ivan Gavrilovich Bilyaev (Іван Гаврилович Біляєв), 1931-1932
 Dmytro Tymofiiovych Strizhak (Дмитро Тимофійович Стрижак), 1933-1935
 DI Drachuk (Д. І. Драчук), 1935-1937
 Mikhail Trokhimovich Stepanov (Михайло Трохимович Степанов), 1938-1940
 Mikhail Kuprianovich Buryanov (Михайло Купріянович Бур'янов), 1940-1941
 SK Boyko (С. К. Бойко), 1944
 Ye. O. Babenko (Є. О. Бабенко), 1944
 Nikifir Kharitonovich Lutsenko (Никифір Харитонович Луценко), 1944-1947
 Andrey Denisovich Chabanny (Андрій Денисович Чабанний), 1947-1953
  (Сергій Захарович Сергієнко), 1953-1954
 Alexey Shvets (Олексій Олексійович Швець), 1954-1955
 Vladimir Makarovich Herman (Володимир Макарович Герман), 1955-1961
 Yukhim Mykytovych Kuchugurny (Юхим Микитович Кучугурний), 1961-1965
 Vladimir Makarovich Herman (Володимир Макарович Герман), 1965-1969
 Boris Karpovich Katerinchuk (Борис Карпович Катеринчук), 1969-1971
 Boris Gavrilovich Tokovy (Борис Гаврилович Токовий), 1971-1977
  (Кім Михайлович Черевко), 1977-1986
 Mykola Ivanovych Moskalenko (Микола Іванович Москаленко), 1986-1989
 Mykola Petrovich Rybalchenko (Микола Петрович Рибальченко), 1989-1990
 Valery Alexandrovich Tkachenko (Валерій Олександрович Ткаченко), 1990-1991
 Vasily Georgievich Mukhin (Василь Георгійович Мухін), 1991-1998
 Alexander Vasilyevich Nikulin (Олександр Васильович Нікулін), 1998–2002
  (Микола Станіславович Чигрін), 2002-2006
 Valeriy Kalchenko, 2006
 Volodymyr Puzakov, 2007-2010
  (Олександр Дмитрович Саінсус), 2010-2014 
  (в.о. Іван Марковський), 2014–2015
  (Андрій Павлович Райкович), 2015–

See also
 Kropyvnytskyi history
 History of Kropyvnytskyi (in Ukrainian)

References

This article incorporates information from the Ukrainian Wikipedia.

History of Kirovohrad Oblast
Kropyvnytskyi